Bring mich nach Hause is the  fourth studio album by the German band Wir sind Helden, released on 27 August 2010. It was preceded by the release of its first single, "Alles" on  20 August. On 21 August, Wir sind Helden began streaming their new album on their MySpace page. This led to the leak of the album the same day.

The band recorded Bring mich nach Hause during a three-month session in Tritonus Studio in Berlin starting with a month of rehearsing in February 2010. It was produced by Ian Davenport. For the first time in the history of the band the basic tracks were recorded live on magnetic tapes later to be digitalized for mastering with Pro Tools. Instead of synthesizers they used classic instruments like accordion, oud and banjo.

Track listing
All tracks by Wir Sind Helden

Charts

Chart positions

Year-end charts

References

2010 albums
Wir sind Helden albums
Columbia Records albums
German-language albums